Christopher Markus (born January 2, 1970) and Stephen McFeely (born February 24, 1970) are American screenwriters and producers. McFeely and Markus were the second and the third most successful screenwriters of all time in terms of U.S. box office receipts with a shared total gross of over $3.1 billion. However, in overall, they are the highest grossing screenwriters altogether in terms of worldwide box office with the total gross of $9.3 billion.

They gained worldwide recognition for their works that include The Chronicles of Narnia film franchise and the Marvel Cinematic Universe (MCU), having written all three Captain America films (The First Avenger, The Winter Soldier and Civil War), in addition to Thor: The Dark World, Avengers: Infinity War and Avengers: Endgame, which is currently the second highest-grossing film of all time unadjusted for inflation. They also created ABC's Agent Carter TV series, set in the MCU.

Life and career

Christopher Markus
Markus was born on January 2, 1970, in Buffalo, New York. He is the son of Budapest, Hungary-born physician Dr. Gabor Markus and registered nurse Rosemary Golebiewski Markus. He has two siblings, sisters Jennifer and Elizabeth. Markus earned a B.A. in creative writing from Rutgers University in 1991. His father is Jewish while his mother is Catholic. , Markus is married to Claire Saunders.

Stephen McFeely
McFeely was born on February 24, 1970, in Walnut Creek, California, and grew up in the San Francisco Bay Area. He earned a B.A. in English from the University of Notre Dame in 1991.

Collaborators
Markus and McFeely met on the graduate program for creative writing at the University of California, Davis in 1994 and they were inspired to become novelists. "We couldn't see how we could make [book] writing our full-time day job," McFeely said in 2011, and they turned to screenwriting instead. After earning their master's degrees in 1996, they moved to Los Angeles to pursue that career, working at such jobs as receptionist at movie production companies. After acquiring an agent, they became professional screenwriters in 1998 with an eventually unproduced script about a real-life Los Angeles murder. Interest generated from the purchased script led HBO Films to commission them to write a biographical drama about actor Peter Sellers. For The Life and Death of Peter Sellers in 2004, they won a Primetime Emmy Award for Outstanding Writing for a Miniseries, Movie or a Dramatic Special. Subsequent work on The Chronicles of Narnia film franchise set them up for the Marvel Cinematic Universe.

They wrote 2022's The Gray Man starring Ryan Gosling and Chris Evans and future projects include The Electric State starring Millie Bobby Brown.

Filmography
Writing credits

Television

References

External links

Christopher Markus biography at Turner Classic Movies
Stephen McFeely biography at Turner Classic Movies

McFeely, Stephen
Markus, 
Christopher
Living people
American male screenwriters
Filmmaking duos
McFeely, Stephen
Primetime Emmy Award winners
Rutgers University alumni
McFeely, Stephen
Screenwriters from New York (state)
Screenwriting duos
M
McFeely, Stephen
Writers from Buffalo, New York
Writers Guild of America Award winners